Henry Cockburn may refer to:

 Henry Cockburn (bishop) (died 1476), Scottish prelate, Bishop of Ross
 Henry Cockburn, Lord Cockburn (1779–1854), Scottish judge and author
 Henry Cockburn (consul) (1859–1927), British Consul, grandson of the above
 Henry Cockburn (footballer) (1921–2004), English international football player